Vaughtia gruveli is a species of sea snail, a marine gastropod mollusk in the family Muricidae, the murex snails or rock snails.

Description
The length of the shell attains 13 mm.

Distribution
This marine species occurs off the Western Sahara.

References

External links
 Dautzenberg P. (1910). Contribution à la faune malacologique de l'Afrique occidentale. Actes de la Société Linnéenne de Bordeaux. 64: 47-228, pls 1-4
 Houart, R. (2003). Two new muricids (Gastropoda: Muricidae) from west Africa. Novapex. 4 (2-3): 51-56

gruveli
Gastropods described in 1910